Catherine Stafford may refer to:

 Katherine de Stafford, Countess of Suffolk (c. 1376–1419)
 Catherine Stafford, Duchess of Buckingham (c. 1458–1497)